Judasz Tadeusz Krusinski (born 1675 – died 1756) was a Polish Jesuit who lived in the Safavid Empire from 1707 to 1725/1728. He acted as an intermediary between the Papacy and the Iranian court, and also functioned as a court translator.

Proficient in Persian and well acquainted with the nation and its people, he was an inhabitant of the Safavid royal capital of Isfahan and a "first-hand witness" to the capture of the city by the rebellious Afghans in 1722. Krusinksi's accounts make him an important primary source on this particular period of the Safavid era.

Notes

Sources
 
 
 

1675 births
1756 deaths
18th-century Polish Jesuits
18th-century people of Safavid Iran
Polish expatriates in Iran
Polish translators